Kealia  (literally, "the salt encrustation" in Hawaiian) is an unincorporated community on the island of Kauai in Kauai County, Hawaii, United States.  Its elevation is 16 feet (5 m).  The Board on Geographic Names officially designated it "Kealia" in 1914.  It has a post office with the ZIP code 96751. James Wood Bush, a Hawaiian veteran of the American Civil War and later Mormon convert was a resident of Kealia.

References

Unincorporated communities in Kauai County, Hawaii
Populated places on Kauai
Unincorporated communities in Hawaii